Shu, referred to as Later Shu and Meng Shu in historiography, was a dynastic state of China and one of the Ten Kingdoms during the Five Dynasties and Ten Kingdoms period of China. It was located in present-day Sichuan with its capital in Chengdu and lasted from 934 to 965. It was the fourth and latest state of this name on the same territory.

Rulers

Rulers family tree

References

 
Five Dynasties and Ten Kingdoms
Former countries in Chinese history
History of Sichuan
934 establishments
10th-century establishments in China
965 disestablishments
10th-century disestablishments in China
States and territories established in the 930s
States and territories disestablished in the 960s